Brainerd Lakes Regional Airport  is a public use airport located three nautical miles (6 km) northeast of the central business district of Brainerd, a city in Crow Wing County, Minnesota, United States. The airport is owned by the city and county. It is mostly used for general aviation but is also served by one commercial airline.

As per Federal Aviation Administration records, the airport had 16,404 passenger boardings (enplanements) in 2010, and 22,233 in 2018.  It is included in the National Plan of Integrated Airport Systems for 2017–2021, which categorized it as a primary commercial service airport (more than 10,000 enplanements per year).

Facilities and aircraft
Brainerd Lakes Regional Airport covers an area of 2,597 acres (1,051 ha) at an elevation of 1,232 feet (376 m) above mean sea level. It has two active runways with concrete surfaces: 16/34 is 7,100 by 150 feet (2,164 x 46 m) and 5/23 is 6,512 by 150 feet (1,984 x 46 m). The airport also has one helipad designated H1 which measures 60 by 60 feet (18 x 18 m).

For the 12-month period ending October 31, 2016, the airport had 37,900 aircraft operations, an average of 104 per day: 87% general aviation, 8% scheduled commercial, 4% air taxi and 1% military. In January 2017, there were 89 aircraft based at this airport: 69 single-engine, 6 multi-engine, 6 jet and 8 helicopter.

Airlines and destinations

Passenger

Cargo

History 
In 2020 the airport received a $17,955,696 CARES Act award.

References

Other sources

 Essential Air Service documents (Docket OST-2011-0135) from the U.S. Department of Transportation:
 Ninety Day Notice (July 15, 2011): of Mesaba Aviation, Inc. and Pinnacle Airlines, Inc. of termination of service at Brainerd, MN.
 Order 2011-9-5 (September 13, 2011): prohibiting suspension of service and requesting proposals.
 Order 2011-11-30 (November 23, 2011): selecting Great Lakes Aviation, Ltd., to provide essential air service (EAS) at six communities at the following annual subsidy rates: Brainerd, Minnesota, $959,865; Fort Dodge, $1,798,693; Iron Mountain, $1,707,841; Mason City, $1,174,468; Thief River Falls, Minnesota, $1,881,815; and Watertown, $1,710,324, for the two-year period beginning when Great Lakes inaugurates full EAS at all six communities.
 Order 2012-6-3 (June 6, 2012): extending the Essential Air Service obligation of the two wholly owned subsidiaries of Pinnacle Airlines Corporation—Mesaba Aviation, Inc. and Pinnacle Airlines, d/b/a Delta Connection at the eight communities listed below (Muscle Shoals, AL; Alpena, MI; Iron Mountain/Kingsford, MI; Brainerd, MN; International Falls, MN; Greenville, MS; Laurel/Hattiesburg, MS; Tupelo, MS) for 30 days, through, July 9, 2012.

External links
 Brainerd Lakes Regional Airport, official site
   from the Minnesota DOT  Airport Directory
 Aerial image as of May 1992 from USGS The National Map
 

Airports in Minnesota
Essential Air Service
Buildings and structures in Crow Wing County, Minnesota
Transportation in Crow Wing County, Minnesota